Aleksandar Avrić (born 6 March 1988) is a Serbian football midfielder.

References

External links
 
 Aleksandar Avrić stats at utakmica.rs
 Aleksandar Avrić stats at footballdatabase.eu

1988 births
Living people
Footballers from Osijek
Association football midfielders
Serbian footballers
RFK Novi Sad 1921 players
FK Spartak Subotica players
FK Hajduk Kula players
FK Radnički Sombor players
FK Inđija players
FK Mladost Velika Obarska players
OFK Bačka players
Serbian SuperLiga players
Serbs of Croatia